Indiana's 11th congressional district was a congressional district for the United States House of Representatives in Indiana. In its final configuration, it covered most of the southern portion of Indianapolis. It was eliminated as a result of the redistricting cycle after the 1980 Census.

It was last represented by Andrew Jacobs, Jr. After the 1980 census, most of its territory became the 10th District, and Jacobs transferred there.

List of members representing the district

References 

 Congressional Biographical Directory of the United States 1774–present

11
Former congressional districts of the United States
1853 establishments in Indiana
Constituencies established in 1853
1873 disestablishments in Indiana
Constituencies disestablished in 1873
Constituencies established in 1875
1875 establishments in Indiana
Constituencies disestablished in 1983
1983 disestablishments in Indiana